Reid Park Street Circuit, also known as the Townsville Street Circuit, is a semi-permanent street circuit located in Townsville, Queensland, Australia. Opened in 2009, the circuit hosts the Townsville 500 Supercars Championship event every year.

The circuit

The Reid Park Street Circuit is reminiscent of the Albert Park Circuit's parkland setting. It winds its way through Reid Park where specially constructed roads form approximately 70 percent of the circuit. The circuit borders the Townsville State High School and Townsville Civic Theatre, crosses the Ross Creek multiple times and runs adjacent to Townsville railway station. The circuit's pit building, and much of the Reid Park infrastructure, is a permanent construction that can be used all year round for various events. The event also has five viewing mounds/grandstands that can seat approximately 12,000.

Paul Dumbrell suggested it is a high grip circuit, while Mark Winterbottom stated that the circuit is like a standard racing circuit but in the middle of a city. Winterbottom described the first corner as almost a clone to the high speed turn eight at the Adelaide Street Circuit, noting that it also produces a great passing opportunity exiting the corner.

In February 2019, parts of the circuit were flooded in the 2019 Townsville flood.

Supercars Championship

On 28 July 2008, the official website of V8 Supercars (the then-name of Supercars) reported that the Queensland Sports Minister, Judy Spence, said the State Government will contribute $2.5 million annually for the first five years of the event. The 2009 Dunlop Townsville 400 was held from 10 to 12 July. In 2014, the event was held as a 500 kilometre event with two 250 kilometre races across the weekend.

Lap records
As of July 2022, the official race lap records at Townsville Street Circuit are listed as:

Notes

References

External links
Official Townsville 400 Website
Map and circuit history at RacingCircuits.info
Townsville receives go-ahead for V8 Supercar race
Townsville readies for V8 street race – contains images of track layout

Motorsport venues in Queensland
Supercars Championship circuits
Sports venues in Townsville